Blehr is a Norwegian surname. Notable people with the surname include:

 Eivind Blehr (1881–1957), Norwegian minister in the NS government of Vidkun Quisling
 Otto Blehr (1847–1927), Norwegian attorney and politician
 Randi Blehr (1851–1928), Norwegian feminist
 Thomas Johan Blehr (1924–2022), Norwegian businessman

See also
 Blair, surname

Norwegian-language surnames